Vigenère may refer to:
Blaise de Vigenère, a 16th-century French cryptographer
The Vigenère cipher, a cipher whose invention was later misattributed to Vigenère